Erik Johannessen (born 22 July 1975 in Oslo) is a Norwegian trombonist) and composer, who has played in bands like Jaga Jazzist, Trondheim Jazz Orchestra, Loud Jazz Band, Lord Kelvin, Funky Hot Grits, Ensemble Denada and Magic Pocket.

Career 

Johannessen grew up at Lambertseter and was educated in jazz at Trondheim Musikkonservatorium and the University of Oslo. He mainly plays jazz and pop music and works with music in many context. He has toured extensively in Europe and the rest of the world with Jaga Jazzist and Ensemble Denada, in Poland with Loud Jazz Band, and in Norway with other bands.

He has played with Joshua Redman and Trondheim Jazzorkester, Eirik Hegdal, Terje Rypdal, Jon Balke, Erlend Skomsvoll, Maria Kannegaard, and his own band, Magic Pocket. He has also released albums with Lord Kelvin and Magic Pocket. He received the Sparebank1 Midtnorges JazZtipendiat 2009/10 with Magic Pocket and was awarded the Spellemannprisen 2010 in open class for the album One-Armed Bandit with Jaga Jazzist.

He has conducted, arranged, and composed for bands such as Kjellerbandet, Midtnorsk Ungdomstorband, Follo Big Band, Orkdal Storband, Kristiansund Storband, Vollen Big Band, Travelin' Storband and Sintefstorbandet. He has worked with Dum Dum Boys, Maria Mena, Martin Hagfors, and Jens Carelius.

Johannessen's first solo album Inkblots (2012) is free improvisation accompanied by bassist Jon Rune Power from the Frode Gjerstad Trio and Magic Pocket drummer Erik Nylander.

Honors 
Spellemannprisen 2010 in open class, for the album One-Armed Bandit with Jaga Jazzist

Discography

As leader
Inkblots (2012)

As sideman
With Jonas Alaska
Jonas Alaska (2011)

With Svigermors Drøm
Fri (1993)
I Fyr og Flammer (1994)

With Dum Dum Boys
Gravitasjon (2006)

With Martin Hagfors
Men and Flies (2009)
I LIke You (2011)

With Thom Hell
God If I Saw Her Now (2008)
All Good Things (2010)

With Jaga Jazzist
One-Armed Bandit (2010)

With Lord Kelvin
Dances in the Smoke (2008)
Radio Has No Future (2011)

With the Loud Jazz Band
Don't Stop the Train (2004)
The Way To Salina (2005)
Passing (2007)
Living Windows (2008)
The Silence (2010)

With Magic Pocket & Morten Qvenild
Katabatic Wind (2011)
 
With Raga Rockers
Shit Happens (2010)

With Susanne Sundfør
The Brothel (2010)

With Trondheim Jazz Orchestra
Live in Oslo (2007)
Wood and Water (2008)
Triads And More (2010), with Eirik Hegdal & Joshua Redman
Kinetic Music (2011), with Magic Pocket

With others
Devil's Ride (2002), with "Tremolo Wankers"
Turn on the Lights (2003), with "Jumpin'Jerry"
Lorenzo is Dead (2003), with "Lorenzo"
Drops of Hope (2003), with "Seljemark"
q.s. (2004), with "Acoustic Accident"
Mingus Schmingus (2004), with "Kjellerbandet"
Troll (2005), with "Lumsk"
A Few Words (2006), with "Hasselgård"
Sildsalat (2006), with "Sintefstorbandet"
The Cheaters (2007), with The Cheaters
Chronicles (2007), with John Heitman & Marc Gregory
The Path of Love (2008), with Terje Nordgarden
Cause And Effect (2008), with Maria Mena
The Plum Album (2008), with Håkon Ellingsen
Finding Nymo (2009), with Helge Sunde & Ensemble Denada
Night Blooms (2009), with "The Opium Cartel"
It's Cold Tonight (2009), with Dan Kristofferson
Real Life Is No Cool (2010), with Lindstrøm & Christabelle
Det Nærmeste Du Kommer (2011), with John Olav Nilsen & Gjengen
Migrant (2011), with "The Captain & Me"
The Architect (2011), with Jens Carelius
When Nobody's Around (2011), with Synne Sanden

References 

20th-century Norwegian trombonists
21st-century Norwegian trombonists
Norwegian jazz trombonists
Male trombonists
Spellemannprisen winners
Musicians from Oslo
1975 births
Living people
21st-century trombonists
Male jazz musicians
Ensemble Denada members
Trondheim Jazz Orchestra members
Magic Pocket members
Jaga Jazzist members